The Diocese of Belley–Ars (Latin: Dioecesis Bellicensis–Arsensis; French: Diocèse de Belley–Ars) is a Latin Church ecclesiastical jurisdiction or diocese of the Catholic Church in France. Erected in the 5th century, the diocese was renamed in 1988 from the former Diocese of Belley to the Diocese of Belley–Ars. Coextensive with the civil department of Ain, in the Region of Rhône-Alpes, the diocese is a suffragan see of the Archdiocese of Lyon. The cathedra of the bishop is at Belley Cathedral. The current bishop is Guy Claude Bagnard, appointed in 1987.

Although suppressed at the time of the Napoleonic Concordat (1801), the Diocese of Belley was re-established in 1822 and took from the Archdiocese of Lyon the arrondissements of Belley, Bourg, Nantua and Trévoux, and from the Archdiocese of Chambéry the Arrondissement of Gex.

History

Local tradition maintains that Belley was evangelized in the 2nd century by the martyrs Marcellus and Valerian, companions of St. Pothinus. The first bishop of historic certainty is Vincentius, mentioned in 552. Others who occupied the see were St. Hippolytus, Abbot of Condat (8th century); St. Anthelm (1163–78), seventh General of the Carthusian Order; St. Arthaud (1179–90), founder of the Carthusians at Arvières; Camus (1609–29), a noted preacher and romancist; and Monseigneur François M. Richard (1872–75), later Cardinal Archbishop of Paris.

Belley honours, in a special manner, St. Amandus, Bishop of Maastricht, who founded the Benedictine Abbey of Nantua about 660; Saint-Vulbas, a patrician of Bourgogne and a war companion of King Dagobert I; Saint Rambert, killed by order of Ebroin in the 7th century, whose name has been given to Saint-Rambert-en-Bugey, a city in the diocese; Saint Trivier, the solitary, who died about 650; Saint Barnard of Vienne (9th century), who founded the great Benedictine Abbey of Ambronay (destroyed during the French Revolution) and died the Archbishop of Vienna; St. Lambert (12th century), founder of the Cistercian Abbey at Chézery; St. Roland, Abbot of Chézery during the 12th century; Saint Stephen of Châtillon, who founded the Carthusian monastery at Portes in 1115, and died Bishop of Die; Saint Stephen of Bourg, who founded the Carthusian monastery at Meyria in 1116; and Saint Jean-Baptiste Vianney (1786–1859), parish priest at Ars.

The Diocese of Belley which, in the Middle Ages, had no less than eight Carthusian monasteries, was the birthplace of the Joséphistes, a religious congregation founded by Jacques Crétenet (1606–67), a layman and surgeon who became a priest after the death of his wife; of the teaching order of the Sisters of St. Charles, founded by Charles Demia of Bourg (1636–89); and of three teaching orders founded in the first half of the 19th century: the Brothers of the Society of the Cross of Jesus; the Brothers of the Holy Family of Belley, and the Sisters of Saint Joseph of Bourg. In 1858 a Trappist monastery was established in the deprived Dombes district.

Cardinal Louis Aleman (1390–1450) and Sister Rosalie (1787–1856), noted in the history of modern Parisian charities, were both native of the Diocese of Belley. Saint Pierre-Louis-Marie Chanel was born at Cuet near Bourg. For thirty years of its existence (1701–31), "Journal de Trévoux", a valuable repertory of the literary and religious history of the period, was published by the Jesuits at Trévoux (now a suburb of Lyon), in the diocese. The church at Brou, near Bourg, was built under the direction of Margaret of Austria, widow of Philibert II the Fair, Duke of Savoy.

Bishops of Belley

To 1000
Audax
Tarniscus
Migetius
Vincent 555–567
Evrould
Claude I
Félix 585–589
Aquilin
Florentin v.650
Hypodimius
Ramnatius(Pracmatius)
Bertere
Ansemonde 722
Saint-Hipolyte
Gondoal
Agisle
Euloge
Adorepert
Ermonbert
Rodoger
Rhitfroy
Étienne I v.790
Ringuin
Sigold
Adabald 886–899
Étienne II v.900
Elisachar 915–927
Isaac
Jérôme v.932
Hérice
Didier
Herdulphe 985
Eudes I 995–1003

1000–1300
Aymon c.1032–1055
Gauceran v.1070
Ponce I 1091–1116
Amicon v.1118–1121
Ponce de Balmey v.1124–1129
Berlion v.1134
Bernard de Portes 1134–1140
Guillaume I 1141–1160
Ponce de Thoire v.1162
Saint Anthelme 1163–1178
Renaud 1178–1184
Artaldus 1188–1190
Eudes II 1190
Bernard II 1198–1207
Benoit de Langres v.1208
Bernard de Thoire-Villars 1211–1212
Boniface de Thoire-Villars 1213
Jean de Rotoire
Pierre de Saint-Cassin
Boniface de Savoie 1232–1240
Bernard IV 1244
Pierre II 1244–1248
Thomas de Thorimbert 1250
Jean de Plaisance 1255–1269
Bernard V v.1272
Berlion D'Amisin v.1280–1282
Guillaume
Pierre de La Baume 1287–1298
Jean de La Baume

1300–1500
Thomas II 1309
Jacques de Saint-André 1325
Amédée 1345
Guillaume de Martel 1356–1368
Edouard de Savoie 1370–1373
Nicolas de Bignes 1374–1394
Rodolphe de Bonet 1413
Guillaume Didier 1430–1437
Perceval de La Baume
Aimeric Segaud
Pierre de Bolomier v.1458
Guillaume de Varax v.1460–1462
Jean de Varax v.1467–1505

1500–1800
Claude de Estavayer 1507–1530
Philippe de La Chambre 1530–1536
Antoine de La Chambre 1536–1575
Jean-Godefroi Ginod 1576–1604
Jean-Pierre Camus 1608–1629
Jean de Passelaigne 1629–1663
Jean-Albert Belin 1663–1677
Pierre du Laurent 1678–1705
François Madot 1705–1712
Jean du Doucet 1712–1745
Jean-Antoine Tinseau 1745–1751
Gabriel Cortois de Quincey 1751–1790, last bishop of Belley
Jean-Baptiste Royer 1791–1793, constitutional bishop

1800-Present

Alexande-Raymond Devie † (13 Jan 1823 Appointed – 25 Jul 1852 Died)
Georges-Claude-Louis-Pie Chalandon † (25 Jul 1852 Succeeded – 4 Feb 1857 Appointed, Archbishop of Aix
Pierre-Henri Gérault de Langalerie † (14 Feb 1857 Appointed – 30 Sep 1871 Appointed, Archbishop of Auch)
François-Marie-Benjamin Richard de la Vergne † (16 Oct 1871 Appointed – 7 May 1875 Appointed, Coadjutor Archbishop of Paris)
Jean-Joseph Marchal † (8 Jun 1875 Appointed – 30 Jan 1880 Appointed, Archbishop of Bourges)
Pierre-Jean-Joseph Soubiranne † (30 Jan 1880 Appointed – Oct 1887 Resigned)
Louis-Henri-Joseph Luçon † (8 Nov 1887 Appointed – 21 Feb 1906 Appointed, Archbishop of Reims)
François-Auguste Labeuche † (13 Jul 1906 Appointed – 18 Mar 1910 Died)
Adolph Manier † (13 Apr 1910 Appointed – 30 Jul 1929 Died)
Virgile-Joseph Béguin † (15 Nov 1929 Appointed – 24 Dec 1934 Appointed, Archbishop of Auch
Amédée-Marie-Alexis Maisonobe † (29 May 1935 Appointed – 15 Nov 1954 Died)
René-Fernand-Eugène Fourrey † (2 Jun 1955 Appointed – 17 May 1975 Retired)
René-Alexandre Dupanloup † (17 May 1975 Succeeded – 7 Nov 1986 Resigned)
Guy-Marie Bagnard (8 Jul 1987 Appointed – 15 June 2012 Resigned)
Pascal Roland (since 15 June 2012)

See also
 Belley
 Bugey
 Catholic Church in France

Notes

Sources 
  Official website
 Catholic Encyclopedia: Diocese of Belley

Roman Catholic dioceses in France
5th-century establishments in sub-Roman Gaul